Star Kitty's Revenge is the third studio album by American recording artist Joi, released on March 19, 2002, by Universal Records.

The album received generally positive reviews from music critics upon its release. In The New Rolling Stone Album Guide (2004), Rolling Stone journalist Jon Caramanica writes that the album "reeked of the unique stank of Atlanta's Dungeon Family collective" and that "for all Kittys raunch, Joi still takes the opportunity to flex her impressive, Betty Davis-style vocals on more traditional material.".

Track listing
"Alright, I'm Back"
"It's Your Life"
"17" of Snow"
"Y'All Better Be Glad"
"Techno Pimp"
"Crave"
"Munchies for Your Love"
"Lick (with Sleepy Brown)"
"What If I Kissed You Right Now?"
"Why They Do What They Do"
"Get On"
"You're a Whore"
"I'm a Woman"
"He's Still a Nigga"
"Nicole"
"Missing You"
"Agnus Dei"
"Jefferson St. Joe"
"Keypsiia, Age 4" (bonus track)

Charts

Notes

References 
 

2002 albums
Albums produced by Raphael Saadiq
Joi (singer) albums